Dedalus-Preis für Neue Literatur is a German literary prize. The award was named after the main character in the novel A Portrait of the Artist as a Young Man by James Joyce. It was awarded between 1996 and 2004.

Winners

 1996 – Anne Duden
 1998 – Wolfgang Schlüter
 2000 – David Wagner
 2002 – Walter Kempowski
 2004 – Reinhard Jirgl

References

German literary awards
1996 establishments in Germany
Awards established in 1996
2004 disestablishments in Germany
Awards disestablished in 2004